HNV may refer to

 Croat National Council, a Croat representative body in Serbia, established 2003
 Croatian National Council, active 1974–1991 in Yugoslavia
 Hebrew Names Version, a translation of the Bible
 Heilbronner Hohenloher Haller Nahverkehr, a German transport conglomerate
 Hyperdimension Neptunia Victory, a video game